Michael Modak (May 18, 1922 – December 12, 1995) was a pitcher in Major League Baseball. He played for the Cincinnati Reds.

References

External links

1922 births
1995 deaths
Major League Baseball pitchers
Cincinnati Reds players
Baseball players from Ohio
People from Campbell, Ohio
Columbia Reds players
Hornell Maples players
Jamestown Falcons players
Sunbury Reds players
Wellsville Yankees players